The 1956 season was the 26th completed season of Finnish Football League Championship, known as the Mestaruussarja.

Overview
The Mestaruussarja was administered by the Finnish Football Association and the competition's 1956 season was contested by 10 teams. KuPS Kuopio won the championship and the two lowest placed teams of the competition, VIFK Vaasa and Pyrkivä Turku, were relegated to the Suomensarja.

League standings

Results

See also
Suomen Cup 1956

Footnotes

References
Finland - List of final tables (RSSSF)

Mestaruussarja seasons
Fin
Fin
1